Adex Wera is a Papua New Guinean former professional rugby league footballer who last played for and captained the Papua New Guinea Hunters in the Queensland Cup. He has represented the Papua New Guinea national team.

References 

1990 births
Living people
Papua New Guinea Hunters captains
Papua New Guinea Hunters players
Papua New Guinea national rugby league team players
Papua New Guinean rugby league players
Rugby league centres